Danner Jesús Pachi Bozo (born April 1, 1984 in Caranavi) is a Bolivian football midfielder that is currently training Saint Andrew's School from La Paz Bolivia.

Club career
Pachi began his career in 2001 with Bolivian giant Bolívar. He spent nearly 7 years with the club with over 200 league appearances throughout this period. In the winter of 2007 he was loaned to Wilstermann, but after six months Bolívar claimed back his services. In his return to the academia, Pachi had an outstanding 2008 season. His good performance awoke the interest of many clubs abroad. In January 2009, he signed for Ecuadorian club LDU Portoviejo, which was relegated at the end of the season. The next year he returned to Bolívar, but did not get much playing time. In 2011, he signed for club Guabirá.

International career
Since his debut in 2004, Pachi has earned 13 caps with the Bolivia national team. He represented his country in 10 FIFA World Cup qualification matches.

Honours

Club
 Bolívar
 Liga de Fútbol Profesional Boliviano: 2002, 2004 (A), 2005 (A), 2006 (C)

References

External links
 
 BDFA profile 
 
 

1984 births
Living people
People from Caranavi Province
Association football midfielders
Bolivian footballers
Bolivia international footballers
Club Bolívar players
C.D. Jorge Wilstermann players
L.D.U. Portoviejo footballers
C.D. ESPOLI footballers
Guabirá players
Club Real Potosí players
Bolivian expatriate footballers
Expatriate footballers in Ecuador